OK Garage (also known as All Revved Up) is a 1998 film written and directed by Brandon Cole. The film won several awards at different film festivals. It premiered in the United States at the Los Angeles Independent Film Festival.

Plot
A woman who gets swindled by a garage mechanic enlists her neighbor and his best friend in exacting some kind of revenge.

Main cast
 John Turturro as Jonny Candellano
 Lili Taylor as Rachel
 Will Patton as Sean
 Gemma Jones as Mrs. Wiggins
 Joseph Maher as Lilly
 Paul Calderón as Carl

References

External links
 
 
 

1998 films
1998 comedy-drama films
American independent films
American comedy-drama films
1998 independent films
1990s English-language films
1990s American films